The Lichfield Garrick is a modern, purpose built theatre in Lichfield, a city in Staffordshire, England.

The main auditorium seats 562 people and the Studio seats 157 people. The theatre is named after the 18th century actor David Garrick, who was brought up in Lichfield.

The Garrick's program includes a variety of touring shows as well as its own productions. It is also used for plays and musicals by local amateur companies. Like most British theatres the Garrick also plays host to an annual Christmas pantomime.

The Lichfield Garrick regularly produces and co-produces work, runs an Artist Development programme and a Community Engagement programme that engages with local schools and arts organisations throughout the year. The theatre also runs weekly programmes including The Garrick Community Choir, The Morning Chorus and The Garrick Youth Theatre.

The Lichfield Garrick is operated as a charitable theatre trust and is independent of Lichfield District Council, although the Council invests in the theatre as its principal partner.

The board of trustees is chaired by Mark Wright.

The theatre won the UK Theatre Award for the West Midlands Most Welcoming Theatre (2017) and the What's On Readers' Award for Staffordshire's Best Arts Venue (2018 - 2020).

History 
The new £5.5 million theatre opened in July 2003 replacing the old Arts centre and Civic Hall. The project received over £1.4 million from the European Structural Funds Program. The architect was Alan Short, founder of Short & Associates. As well as adding a fly tower and orchestra pit to the main auditorium, the theatre was remodelled, so that new front of house areas could be built, better backstage access provided and a studio theatre included. It is architecturally notable for its unique natural ventilation system, which is an eco-friendly design. In 2004 it won the Green Apple Award for Environmental Best Practice and CIBSE Project of the Year, among others. However, the building received a mixed response from the public, with some people arguing the theatre's design was not in keeping with the character of Lichfield.

The first production, The Recruiting Officer, was directed by and starred Corin Redgrave. George Farquhar is said to have written some of the play while staying at the George Hotel in Lichfield. It was also the first play that David Garrick performed in.

Garrick Rep Company 
The Garrick Rep Company  was formed in 2005 with the aim of providing theatre goers with powerful and exciting performances, produced in-house at the Garrick Theatre. Early productions were presented under the name of RDC Productions.

References

External links 
 Official Website
 Guide to what's on in theatres around the UK
 Twitter
 Official Facebook

Theatres in Staffordshire
2003 establishments in England
Buildings and structures in Lichfield